DPL may refer to:

Location
 Delhi Public Library, Located in Delhi, India
 Denver Public Library, located in Colorado, USA
 Detroit Public Library, located in Michigan, USA
 Dipolog Airport, located in the Philippines
 DPL Inc., a public utility in west central Ohio, USA
 Dunedin Public Libraries, located in New Zealand

Media
 .dpl, the filename extension of Borland software libraries
 Dolby Pro Logic, a surround sound processing technology
 Driver: Parallel Lines, the fourth game in the Driver video game series

Others
 Debian Project Leader, head of the Debian Linux distribution
 Defensive Patent License
 Delmarva Power and Light Company, a subsidiary of Exelon
 Democratic Party (Luxembourg), a liberal political party
 Descriptor Privilege Level, the highest CPU resource access level on the x86 architecture
 Designated place, a Canadian census designation for unincorporated communities in the 100–1,000 population range
 Dhaka Premier League, a club List A cricket tournament in Bangladesh
 Dhangadhi Premier League, a franchise cricket tournament in Dhangadhi, Nepal
 Diagnostic peritoneal lavage, a procedure used to determine whether blunt trauma victims require surgery
 Digital Light Processing, a projector technology
 Digital Private Line, a squelch system used by Motorola
 The FAA identifier for Duplin County Airport
 Datamax Printer Language, a printer page description language
 Denied Party List, Denied trade screening